Lapovo is a town and municipality located in the Šumadija District of central Serbia. The population of the town is 7,837 according to the 2011 census.

History
The first mention of Lapovo dates from the 12th century when Stefan Nemanja conquered region of Lepenica from Bizanthy. More accurate information about Lapovo's existence came after the Battle of Kosovo in 1389 while duke Mihailo or MIhalj was running the estate in today's region of Lapovo.

The Charter of Princess Milica from 1395 mentions landed property of Duke Mihajlo in Hlapova plain, Lapovo today, on the basis of which we can conclude that Lapovo is a village which has a medieval origin. After the liberation from the Turks, a rapid development of Lapovo began, primarily thanks to its favourable geostrategic position. In 1896 Lapovo was declared for the town by decree of King Aleksandar Obrenovic. Municipality of Lapovo is located at Corridor 10, at the intersection of highway Belgrade-Nis. Lapovo also represents one of the most important railway hubs, on the railway line Belgrade-Nis-Athens. Lapovo is currently in a phase of economical development, which is accompanied by the appearance of a large number of national and foreign investors.

Demographics

Economy
The Lapovo industrial zone has been formed between international highway A1 motorway and railroad tracks,  from Belgrade.

The following table gives a preview of total number of employed people per their core activity (as of 2017):

Notable people
 Momčilo Stojanović

Gallery

References

Populated places in Šumadija District
Municipalities and cities of Šumadija and Western Serbia